Adolfo Celi (27 July 1922 – 19 February 1986) was an Italian film actor and director. Born in Curcuraci, Messina, Sicily, Celi appeared in nearly 100 films, specialising in international villains. Although a prominent actor in Italian cinema and famed for many roles, he is best remembered internationally for his portrayal of Emilio Largo in the 1965 James Bond film Thunderball. Celi later spoofed his Thunderball role in the film OK Connery (aka Operation Double 007) opposite Sean Connery's brother, Neil Connery.

Life and career

Celi became a film actor in post-war Italy. He left the Italian film industry when he emigrated to Brazil where he co-founded the Teatro Brasileiro de Comédia along with the Brazilian stage greats Paulo Autran and Tônia Carrero in São Paulo He was successful as a stage actor in Argentina and Brazil. He directed three films in South America in the 1950s, including the Brazilian hit Tico-Tico no Fubá in 1952.

Celi began a new popular career when he played the villain in Philippe de Broca's That Man from Rio, selected by de Broca on location in Rio de Janeiro. The popularity of the film led him to be cast as camp commandant Battaglia opposite Frank Sinatra and Trevor Howard's Allied POWs in the 1965 Second World War escape drama Von Ryan's Express. This led him to his most well known role as Largo in Thunderball. He is also known to international audiences as Ralph Valmont, one of the villains in the Mario Bava action thriller Danger: Diabolik and the
celebrated Fernando Di Leo's poliziottesco film Hired to Kill (La mala ordina, 1972) as Don Vito Tressoldi.

Celi appeared as a protagonist in some Italian comedies including Amici Miei and Brancaleone alle Crociate and
did some television work, notably in mini-series Petrosino (1972), portraying the legendary Italian-American cop, and
as the ruthless aristocrat, the Baron of Carini in another very popular mini-series, La Baronessa di Carini (1975).

In addition to his native languages Sicilian and Italian, Celi was fluent in several languages, including English, Spanish, French, German and Portuguese. Despite his proficiency in English, his thick Sicilian accent meant that he was usually dubbed when he appeared in English language films; however, he was not dubbed in the 1981 BBC serial The Borgias, in which Celi played Rodrigo Borgia, with his thickly-accented English difficult for certain TV critics and viewers to understand.

Personal life and death
Celi was married three times. He died of a heart attack in Siena in 1986. His daughter Alessandra Celi, is an actress.

Filmography

 A Yank in Rome (Un americano in vacanza, 1946) as Tom
 Christmas at Camp 119 (Natale al campo 119, 1947) as John, il sergent americano
 Hey Boy (Proibito rubare, 1948)
 Immigrants (Emigrantes, 1948) as Il professore
 Caiçara (1950) as Genovés
 Tico-Tico no Fubá (1952) (uncredited)
 Sandokan the Great (Sandokan, la tigre di Mompracem, 1963) as James Brooke
 That Man from Rio (L'homme de Rio, 1964) as Mário de Castro
 Three Nights of Love (Tre notti d'amore, 1964)
 Male Companion (Un monsieur de compagnie, 1964) as Benvenuto
 Beautiful Families (1964) (segment "Amare è un po' morire") as Professore Della Porta
 Crime on a Summer Morning (Par un beau matin d'été, 1965) as Van Willie
 Von Ryan's Express (1965) as Major Battaglia
 The Agony and the Ecstasy (1965) as Giovanni de' Medici
 Slalom (1965) as Riccardo
 A Man Named John (E venne un uomo, 1965) as Msgr. Radini Tedeschi
 Thunderball (1965) as Emilio Largo
 El Greco (1966) as Don Miguel de Las Cuervas
 Yankee (1966) as Grande Concho
 Target for Killing (Das Geheimnis der gelben Mönche, 1966) as Henry Perkins
 Pleasant Nights (Le piacevoli notti, 1966) as Bernadozzo
 Grand Prix (1966) as Agostini Manetta
 King of Hearts (Le roi de coeur, 1966) as Colonel Alexander MacBibenbrook
 Dirty Heroes (Dalle Ardenne all'inferno, 1967) as Luc Rollman
 Master Stroke (Colpo maestro al servizio di Sua Maestà britannica, 1967) as Mr. Bernard
 The Honey Pot (1967) as Inspector Rizzi
 OK Connery (1967) as Mr. Thai - 'Beta'
 The Bobo (1967) as Francisco Carbonell
 Grand Slam (Ad ogni costo, 1967) as Mark Milfford
 Fantabulous Inc. (La Donna, il sesso e il superuomo, 1967) as Karl Maria van Beethoven
 Death Sentence (Sentenza di morte, 1968) as Friar Baldwin
 Seven Times Seven (Sette volte sette, 1968) as Warden
 Diabolik (1968) as Ralph Valmount
 It's Your Move (Uno scacco tutto matto, 1969) as Bayon / Guinet
 Alibi (L'alibi, 1969) as Adolfo
 Midas Run (1969) as General Ferranti
 Detective Belli (Un Detective, 1969) as Avvocato Fontana
 A Man for Emmanuelle (Io, Emmanuelle, 1969) as Sandri
 The Archangel (L'arcangelo, 1969) as Marco Tarrochi Roda
 In Search of Gregory (1969) as Max
 Death Knocks Twice (Blonde Köder für den Mörder, 1969) as Professor Max Spigler
 Rendezvous with Dishonour (Appuntamento col disonore, 1970) as Hermes
 Fragment of Fear (1970) as Signor Bardoni
 The Cop (Un condé, 1970) as Le Commissaire principal / Chief of police
 Brancaleone at the Crusades (Brancaleone alle crociate, 1970) as Re Boemondo
 Finale di partita (Alla ricerca di Gregory, 1970)
 They Have Changed Their Face (Hanno cambiato faccia, 1971) as Giovanni Nosferatu
 Una chica casi decente (1971) as César Martín de Valdés 'Duque'
 Murders in the Rue Morgue (1971) as Inspector Vidocq
 1931: Once Upon a Time in New York (Piazza pulita, 1972) as The Pole
 Brother Sun, Sister Moon (Fratello sole, sorella luna, 1972) as Consul
 Eye in the Labyrinth (L'occhio nel labirinto, 1972) as Frank
 Who Killed the Prosecutor and Why? (Terza ipotesi su un caso di perfetta strategia criminale, 1972) as Inspector Vezzi
 Who Saw Her Die? (Chi l'ha vista morire?, 1972) as Serafian
 Naked Girl Killed in the Park (Ragazza tutta nuda assassinata nel parco, 1972) as Inspector Huber
 Long Arm of the Godfather (La mano lunga del padrino, 1972) as Don Carmelo
 Hired to Kill (La mala ordina, 1972) as Vito
 Hitler: The Last Ten Days (1973) as Gen. Krebs
 Le Mataf (Tre per una grande rapina, 1973) as Me Desbordes
 Black Holiday (La villeggiatura, 1973) as Commissioner Rizzuto
 The Devil Is a Woman (Il sorriso del grande tentatore, 1974) as Father Borrelli
 The Phantom of Liberty (Le Fantôme de la liberté, 1974) as Le docteur de Legendre / Doctor Pasolini
 And Then There Were None (Ein unbekannter rechnet ab, 1974) as Gen. André Salvé
 The Balloon Vendor (Il venditore di palloncini, 1974) as Dr. Monforte
 Libera, My Love (Libera, amore mio..., 1975) as Felice Valente – Libera's father
 My Friends (Amici miei, 1975) as Professor Sassaroli
 L'amaro caso della baronessa di Carini (1975) as Don Mariano D'Agrò
 Sandokan (1976) as James Brooke
 Live Like a Cop, Die Like a Man (Uomini si nasce poliziotti si muore, 1976) as Captain
 Pure as a Lily (Come una rosa al naso, 1976) as L'onorevole
 Confessions of a Frustrated Housewife (La moglie di mio padre, 1976) as Antonio Lenzini
 Goodnight, Ladies and Gentlemen (Signore e signori, buonanotte, 1976) as Vladimiro Palese
 The Next Man (1976) as Al Sharif
 The Big Operator (Le Grand escogriffe, 1976) as Rifai
 Merciless Man (Genova a mano armata, 1976) as Commissario Lo Gallo
 Febbre da cavallo (1976) as Judge
 Che notte quella notte! (1977)
 The Passengers (Les Passagers, 1977) as Boetani
 Pane, burro e marmellata (1977) as Aristide Bertelli
 Holocaust 2000 (1977) as Dr. Kerouac
 La tigre è ancora viva: Sandokan alla riscossa! (1977) as James Brooke
 Man of Corleone (L'uomo di Corleone, 1977)
 The Perfect Crime (Indagine su un delitto perfetto, 1978) as Sir Harold Boyd
 Professor Kranz tedesco di Germania (1978) as Carcamano
 Le braghe del padrone (1978) as Euginio – the president
 L'affittacamere (1979)
 Café Express (1980) as Ispettore capo Ministero
 Car-napping (1980) as Head of police in Palermo
 Madly in Love (Innamorato pazzo, 1981) as Gustavo VI di San Tulipe
 Perdóname, amor (1982) as Ruggero Rivelli
 Monsignor (1982) as Cardinal Vinci
 All My Friends Part 2 (Amici miei atto II, 1982) as Professor Sassaroli
 Cenerentola '80 (1984) as Principe Goncalvo Gherardeschi
 Passaporto segnalato (1985) as Avvocato Santi
 All My Friends Part 3 (Amici miei atto III, 1985) as Professor Sassaroli
 Il giocatore invisibile (1985)
 Due assi per un turbo (1987) as Il Caposcalo

References

External links
 

1922 births
1986 deaths
Film people from the Province of Messina
Italian male film actors
Italian male stage actors
Italian male television actors
Italian film directors
Italian film producers
Actors from Messina
Accademia Nazionale di Arte Drammatica Silvio D'Amico alumni
20th-century Italian male actors